William T. Holmes (June 7, 1846 – August 31, 1916) was a Union Army soldier in the American Civil War who received the U.S. military's highest decoration, the Medal of Honor.

Holmes was born in Vermilion County, Illinois on June 7, 1846, and entered service at Indianapolis, Indiana. He was awarded the Medal of Honor, for extraordinary heroism shown on April 6, 1865, at the Battle of Sailor's Creek, while serving as a Private with Company A, 3rd Regiment Indiana Cavalry. He won his medal for capturing the flag of the 27th Virginia Infantry Regiment. His Medal of Honor was issued on May 3, 1865.

Holmes died at the age of 70, on August 31, 1916, and was buried at Bean Cemetery in Appleton City, Missouri.

Medal of Honor citation

References

External links

1846 births
1916 deaths
People from Vermilion County, Illinois
Burials in Missouri
Union Army soldiers
United States Army Medal of Honor recipients
American Civil War recipients of the Medal of Honor
People from Appleton City, Missouri
Military personnel from Illinois